A hypothetical chemical compound is a chemical compound that has been conceived of, but is not known to have been synthesized, observed, or isolated (identified or shown to exist).

Some hypothetical compounds cannot form at all. Others might turn out to be highly unstable, decomposing, isomerizing, polymerizing, rearranging, or disproportionating. Some are thought to exist only briefly as reactive intermediates, or in vacuum (e.g. helium hydride ion).

Some cannot hold together due to steric hindrance (e.g. tetra-tert-butylmethane) or bond stress (e.g. tetrahedrane).

Some have no known pathway for synthesis (e.g. hypercubane).

Some compounds of radioactive elements have never been synthesized due to their radioactive decay and short half-lives (e.g. francium hydroxide)

Some "parent compounds" have not been or cannot be isolated, even though stable structural analogs with substituents have been discovered or synthesized (e.g. borole).

Hypothetical compounds are often predicted or expected from known compounds, such as a families of salts for which the "parent acid" is not a stable molecule, or in which salts form with some cations but not others. "Phantom acids" such as disulfurous acid and sulfurous acid.

Hypothetical compounds are used in some thought experiments.

Some compounds long regarded as hypothetical have later been isolated. Ethylene dione was suggested in 1913 and observed spectroscopically in 2015.

Other compounds were once thought to have already been produced, but are now regarded as hypothetical chemical compounds unlikely to ever be produced, such as polywater.

Prediction
Stability and other properties can be predicted using energy calculations and computational chemistry.

"[Using] the Born–Haber cycle to estimate ... the heat of formation ... can be used to determine whether a hypothetical compound is stable." However, "a negative formation enthalpy does not automatically imply the existence of a hypothetical compound." The method predicts that NaCl is stable but NeCl is not. It predicted XePtF6 based on the stability of O2PtF6.

References

External links

 
Theoretical chemistry